The Bend 500 was a planned motor racing event for Supercars, to be held at The Bend Motorsport Park in Tailem Bend, South Australia commencing in 2020. The event was cancelled due to the COVID-19 pandemic.

Format
The event, which would have been run over three days, was scheduled to feature a twenty-five minute qualifying session followed by a top-ten shootout to determine the grid. This would have been followed by a 500 kilometre race with the Supercars primary drivers joined by co-drivers. The event was to have been included with the Bathurst 1000 and the Gold Coast 600 in the annual Enduro Cup.

History
The Bend Motorsport Park opened in 2018 and hosted The Bend SuperSprint for two years before being announced as the host of an endurance race as part of the 2020 Supercars Championship, replacing the Sandown 500 as the series' annual 500 kilometre race. In June 2020, the event was removed from the second revision of the 2020 calendar, caused by the COVID-19 pandemic, however a double-header sprint event at The Bend was then added to the calendar in a further calendar shuffle in August 2020. The event was again excluded from the 2021 Supercars Championship calendar.

References

Motorsport in South Australia
Recurring sporting events established in 2020
Supercars Championship races
2020 establishments in Australia
Endurance motor racing